Brendan Lynskey (born 7 May 1956 in Meelick, County Galway) is an Irish former sportsperson. He played hurling with his local club Meelick-Eyrecourt and was a member of the Galway senior inter-county team in the 1980s and 1990s.

References

1956 births
Living people
Meelick-Eyrecourt hurlers
Galway inter-county hurlers
Connacht inter-provincial hurlers
All-Ireland Senior Hurling Championship winners